Progressive Conservative may refer to an advocate of progressive conservatism.

Progressive Conservative may also refer to:

Canada
 Progressive Conservative Party of Canada, a former Canadian federal party; a successor of the original Conservative Party of Canada and a predecessor of the modern-day Conservative Party of Canada
 Progressive-Conservative (candidate), who supported both Progressive Party and Conservative Party

Provincial
Current
 Progressive Conservative Party of Manitoba
 Progressive Conservative Party of New Brunswick
 Progressive Conservative Party of Newfoundland and Labrador
 Progressive Conservative Association of Nova Scotia
 Progressive Conservative Party of Ontario
 Progressive Conservative Party of Prince Edward Island
 Progressive Conservative Party of Saskatchewan
Defunct
 Progressive Conservative Association of Alberta, a predecessor of the United Conservative Party of Alberta
 Yukon Progressive Conservative Party, a predecessor of the Yukon Party

Elsewhere

Politics
 Centre-right politics
 Red Tory, is an adherent of a centre-right or paternalistic-conservative political philosophy derived from the Tory tradition, predominantly in Canada, but also in the United Kingdom

Politicians
 Nick Boles, a current self-subscribed 'Independent Progressive Conservative' British MP after his departure of his former party, the Conservative Party of the United Kingdom since April 1

See also
 Conservative
 Conservatism (disambiguation)
 Progressive (disambiguation)
 Progressive Conservative Party (disambiguation)